Singh Is Kinng is a 2008 Indian Hindi-language action comedy film directed by Anees Bazmee from a screenplay by Bazmee and Suresh Nair. The film stars Akshay Kumar, Katrina Kaif, Om Puri, Ranvir Shorey, Neha Dhupia, Javed Jaffrey, Sonu Sood, and Sudhanshu Pandey. In the film, Happy Singh (Kumar) is sent to Australia to reunite Lakhan Singh (Sood), a crime boss, with his ill father but finds himself facing love and trouble instead. The film also featured a song and a music video with American rapper Snoop Dogg. A major part of the film was shot in Australia. The film marked the fourth collaboration of Kumar and Kaif after Humko Deewana Kar Gaye (2006), Namastey London (2007) and Welcome (2007). The spelling of the word "king" in the film's title with an additional letter "n" was based on advice provided by a numerologist. 

Singh Is Kinng released on 8 August 2008, and received mixed to positive reviews from critics upon release and proved to be a big commercial success, earning ₹136 crore worldwide, thus becoming the third-highest grossing Hindi film of 2008. 

At the 3rd Asian Film Awards, Singh Is Kinng received 1 nomination – Best Actor (Kumar). Moreover,  at the 54th Filmfare Awards, the film won Best Female Playback Singer (Shreya Ghoshal for "Teri Ore"), in addition to a nomination for Best Actor (Kumar).

Although often misinterpreted as a prequel, it is unrelated to the 2015 film Singh Is Bliing also starring Kumar in the lead role, hence qualifying the latter as a quasi-sequel.

Plot
Lakhan “Lucky” Singh (Sonu Sood), is the king of the Australian underworld. He is accompanied by his Sikh mafia associates, Julie (Neha Dhupia), Mika (Jaaved Jaffrey), Pankaj Udaas (Yashpal Sharma), Raftaar (Sudhanshu Pandey), Dilbagh Singh (Manoj Pahwa) and Guruji Gurbaksh Singh (Kamal Chopra). In a small village in Punjab, the birthplace of Lucky, there lives another Sikh, Happy Singh (Akshay Kumar). Happy, though good at heart, has unintentionally caused many problems in the village, and the villagers are fed up with him. They decide to send Happy on a long trip to Australia with his friend Rangeela (Om Puri) to bring Lucky back to Punjab, which will keep Happy out of the village for some time and bring peace to the village.

But at the airport, Happy's and Rangeela's tickets to Australia are accidentally exchanged with those of Puneet (Ranvir Shorey), who was to fly to Egypt. In Egypt, Happy meets Sonia (Katrina Kaif) and falls deeply in love with her. But he does not express his love to her. Leaving her behind, he heads to Australia to meet Lucky. Lucky refuses to return to his hometown and throws Happy and Rangeela out of his house. Penniless, Happy finds warmth and affection in an elderly lady (Kirron Kher) who provides him with food in spite of being a stranger.

Lucky winds up in a hospital, paralyzed, after a series of violent incidents that Happy has caused. (In one of these incidents, his head is bumped severely, and the trauma from the resultant concussion is what paralyzes him.) Unexpectedly, it is Happy who is given the position of the "Kinng." The lady who helped Happy is obviously worried and depressed, as her daughter is returning from Egypt with her wealthy boyfriend, Puneet. The daughter does not know that after the death of her father years ago, her mother had become poverty-stricken and been reduced to work as a flower seller. Happy gives her Lucky's spacious house and makes all his mafia associates work for her.

The lady's daughter arrives; to Happy's horror, she is none other than Sonia. Heartbroken, Happy is forced to make a show of happiness to Sonia. Puneet says that he too would have had a good time with Happy and Sonia in Egypt had his ticket to Egypt not been exchanged in the airport, because of which he had ended up in Australia. Puneet had always been jealous of Sonia being with Happy; however, he doubts something is going on between them.

Meanwhile, Lucky's gang members spend enough time with the kindhearted Kinng for most of them to be reformed and give up lawless lives in favour of law-abiding ones.

In spite of herself, Sonia falls in love with Happy and the truth becomes difficult to hide. Puneet sets his heart to marry Sonia. Sonia gets trapped in an emotional tug-of-war between Puneet, who loves her, and Happy, whom she loves.

In the confusion, Happy's associates reveal to Puneet who they are, and that Happy is the Kinng of the Australian underworld, not a manager as Puneet had believed him to Puneet, in turn, reveals this to Sonia, who has become aware of her own poverty.

Soon Puneet meets Mika, Lucky's other brother, who agrees to kill Happy. Puneet's motives to kill Happy, however, differ from Mika's: Puneet wants to kill Happy to keep Sonia away from him, whereas Mika wants to kill Happy to make himself Kinng.

On the day of Puneet and Sonia's marriage, they are sitting in Mandap and they are set all to marry but gunshots firing are heard and all the gangster also come in Mandap. Puneet leaves Mandap in order to save himself from gunshot. Happy takes Puneet's place in order to save Sonia unaware that he is marrying Sonia, both run around the fire seven times, essentially getting married. After Happy and Sonia married then punnet seeks forgiveness from them and then Puneet's father take him. During all this, Mika attempts to kill Lucky, whose head is bumped, and the trauma-induced paralysis he had suffered from is relieved. However, he is heartbroken on realizing that Mika tried to kill him. Suddenly, Mika turns up on the spot, ready to kill Happy, armed with a gang and his new special glasses and hearing aid. As he is about to shoot, Lucky steps up and stops him. Then a dialogue ensues between Mika, Happy, Lucky, and the associates of the Kinng. Then Happy tells him that being the "kinng" is not as great as it may seem and explains to him the characteristics of a true Sikh. Lucky confesses that he had always found being Kinng a source of misery, because a true kinng fights for others, not for himself. Overcome with remorse, Mika drops his gun. The movie ends with Happy's and Sonia's marriage and the returns of Lucky and his gang members to their homes in the village.

Cast
 
 Akshay Kumar as Happy Singh
 Katrina Kaif as Sonia Singh, Puneet's fiancée
 Om Puri as Rangeela Mann
 Ranvir Shorey as Puneet Sabarwal, Sonia's fiance
 Jaaved Jaaferi as Mika and Puneet's father (Dual Role)
 Neha Dhupia as Julie Gupta
 Sonu Sood as Lakhan "Lucky" Singh
 Kirron Kher as Mrs. Singh (Sonia's mother)
 Kamal Chopra as Guruji Gurbaksh Singh
 Sudhanshu Pandey as Raftaar Mann
 Yashpal Sharma as Pankaj Udaas
 Satwant Kaur as Lakhan's mother
 Manoj Pahwa as Dilbagh Singh
 Chayan Sarkar as Man at Airport
 Gurpreet Ghuggi as Manjeet 
 Snoop Dogg as himself
 Gleven Roy Abugan as himself
 Tyson Bradly as DJ
 Khyali as groom
 Sanchita Choudary as Tanya singh 
 Moksha Rana as Little Blind Girl

Music
The music of the film was composed by Pritam and the lyrics were written by Mayur Puri. The title song was composed by the British band RDB. The soundtrack was launched officially at the IIFA Awards in Bangkok on 8 June 2008.

Snoop Dogg has a cameo in the video of the title song.

Shreya Ghoshal, who sang the song "Teri Ore," won the Filmfare Award for Best Female Playback Singer and the IIFA Award for Best Female Playback Singer. Mayur Puri was nominated for the Star Screen Awards, in the "Best Lyrics" category, for the same song. According to the Indian trade website Box Office India, with around  units sold, this film's soundtrack album was the year's third highest-selling.

The song "Bhootni Ke" used in the film is sung by Mika Singh.

Track listing

Reception

Critical response 
Taran Adarsh of Bollywood Hungama gave the film 4 out of 5 stars, and stated "Singh Is Kinng lives up to the hype and hoopla. At the box-office, the film will fetch a hurricane-like start and will be record-shattering. Notwithstanding the new oppositions in the weeks to come, it will rule the hearts of the aam junta. Blockbuster Hit!" Times of India gave the film 3 out of 5 stars, and stated "The film has an entertaining first half. The second half does get cluttered, clumsy and loose with loads of wasted talent in the likes of Ranvir Shorey, Javed Jaffrey and a side-lined Om Puri." Shruti Basin of Planet Bollywood gave the film 3.5 stars out of 5, and stated "Singh is Kinng is a great watch. Enjoy the happy atmosphere while cheering on the new King of Bollywood, Akshay Kumar." Gaurav Malani of Economic Times stated, "This king doesn't quite rule your heart unconditionally." Rajeev Masand gave the film 2 out of 5 stars, and stated "Singh is Kinng celebrates the spirit of being a Sikh, and yet it completely disregards the most basic detail of Sikh identity – how can your Sikh characters sport turbans but not full beards?" Aseem Chhabra of Rediff.com gave the film 2.5 stars out of 5, and stated "Akshay is the Kinng". Lisa Tsering of Hollywood Reporter stated, "Singh Is Kinng is a rollicking late-night party you don't want to end - with a friendly, funny and generous host; gorgeous women; pumped-up bhangra music and an extravagant, booze-soaked scuffle or two." Indicine gave the film 3 out of 5 stars, and stated, "Singh is King is a typical Akshay Kumar mindless entertainer which has a great first half, beautifully picturised songs and a gorgeous Katrina Kaif. But what makes it more worthwhile is Akshay Kumar, who holds the movie together, well supported by Om Puri." Shubhra Gupta of The Indian Express stated, "Whatever else it notches up, 'Singh Is Kinng' will always and forever be known as the first Hindi film in Punjabi : everyone talks as if sarson da saag is coming out of their mouths." 

Amodini of Friday Nirvana gave the film 0 out of 5 stars, and stated that it was a "dumbed-down masala". Janak of Cinema Online Malaysia gave the film 5 out of 5 stars, and stated "Singh Is Kinng is a fantastic five-star movie with wonderful casts and beautiful songs. You may find all the elements of Hindi cinema in this film, from action to comedy, and drama to romance. This is a movie not to be missed, especially if you are a Punjabi and a Bollywood fan. I'm still buzzing from the soundtrack!" Wietske Uneken of Cinemagazine gave the film 3 stars out of 5 and stated, "Thanks to its humorous approach, 'Singh is Kinng' is an entertaining film." Sri of Frames N Pages stated, "The film lacks logic, but still a great entertainer." R. Paul Dhillon of Georgia Straight stated, "The filmmakers seem interested only in manipulating the audience, with absolutely no regard for plot, characters, or believability." Molodezhnaja gave the film 2.5 stars out of 5. Rachel Saltz of New York Times stated, "“Singh Is Kinng” isn’t a great movie. But the immensely likable Akshay Kumar shines as a Capraesque hero who spreads bedrock Indian values." Sonia Chopra of Sify gave the film 3 out of 5 stars, and stated "And there it is: yet another critic-proof film that the audience has pre-decided to like, such that you imagine them displaying the relevant finger to those who disagree."

Sikh controversy 
Some members of the Sikh community had expressed their dissatisfaction over the portrayal of Sikhs in the movie. On 1 August 2008, the Delhi Sikh Gurdwara Management Committee (DSGMC) wrote a letter to Sheila Dikshit, the then Chief Minister of Delhi, asking her to ban the movie, as the trailer showed Akshay Kumar's character sporting a trimmed beard. According to their religious guidelines, male Sikhs should not trim their beards, and the DSGMC found this offensive. After negotiations with the DSGMC authorities, the film was given clearance on 7 August 2008.

Awards and nominations

References

External links
 

2008 films
2000s action comedy-drama films
Indian action comedy-drama films
2000s Hindi-language films
2000s masala films
Hari Om Entertainment films
Films featuring songs by Pritam
Films directed by Anees Bazmee
Films about organised crime in Australia
2008 romantic comedy-drama films
Indian romantic comedy-drama films
Viacom18 Studios films
Indian remakes of Hong Kong films
Reliance Entertainment films
Films shot in Australia
Films shot in Egypt
Films about Sikhism
Films set in Egypt